Chrysosplenium oppositifolium, the opposite-leaved golden-saxifrage, is a species of flowering plant in the family Saxifragaceae, native to Europe (Belgium, Czechoslovakia, Denmark, France, Germany, Great Britain, Ireland, Italy, Netherlands, Norway, Poland, Portugal, Spain, Sweden, Switzerland and former Yugoslavia). It was first described by Carl Linnaeus in 1753.

References

oppositifolium
Flora of Europe
Plants described in 1753
Taxa named by Carl Linnaeus